"Blastoff" is a song by American hip hop collective and record label Internet Money, featuring performances from American rappers Juice Wrld and Trippie Redd. It was released on August 28, 2020, as the ninth track from Internet Money's debut album B4 the Storm. An emotionally-driven melodic song, it sees the artists crooning about their past relationships. The song is a reworked version of a leaked track called "Tragedy".

Background and recording
The song initially leaked under the title "Tragedy", with a different beat. One of the song's producer's, Nick Mira, also produced Juice Wrld's breakout hit, "Lucid Dreams". Mira recalled that "Blastoff" was done at least a year prior to its release. The song went through over 40 versions with different mixes and layouts tried out. Co-producer and Internet Money founder Taz Taylor said it "meant something" to him to have Juice on the album, as it was the final song they worked on. Taylor was working on "Blastoff" just a day before Juice's death, and called his verse "crazy". Originally, Juice and Trippie Redd's other collaboration, "6 Kiss", was to be included on B4 the Storm, however that track was instead released in November 2019.

Composition
A soulful, melodic song, "Blastoff" contains a "delicate, Spanish guitar approach" laid over Juice Wrld's "heartbroken", "emotional" lyrics: "I should've turned away when I found out you were demonic / Let's be honest, you're the devil's daughter".

Critical reception
In NMEs album review, Kyann-Sian Williams stated: "Luckily the lower half of B4 the Storm is more cohesive than the top, a run that begins with a great display of braggadocio from the late Juice Wrld (aka Jarad Higgins) and Redd. The duo's chemistry has been undeniable – take their viral  TikTok viral hit '6 Kiss' – and 'Blastoff' perfectly showcases their interconnected talents". HotNewHipHops Mitch Findlay deemed the song a "bittersweet standout" from the album and said the duo make a compelling team. Jessica McKinney of Complex named it among the Best New Music of the Week, noting how the artists reflect on their past relationships.

Charts

Certifications

References

2020 songs
Juice Wrld songs
Trippie Redd songs
Song recordings produced by Taz Taylor (record producer)
Songs written by Juice Wrld
Songs written by Nick Mira
Songs written by Taz Taylor (record producer)
Songs written by Trippie Redd
Songs released posthumously
Songs written by Diplo
Song recordings produced by Diplo